

Championships

World Championship
Men
United States 137, Russia 91
Women
United States 100, Australia 95

Professional
Men
1994 NBA Finals:  Houston Rockets over the New York Knicks 4-3.  MVP:  Hakeem Olajuwon
 1994 NBA Playoffs
1993-94 NBA season
1994 NBA draft
1994 NBA All-Star Game
Eurobasket:  None
Women
Eurobasket Women:  None

College
Men
NCAA
Division I:  Arkansas 76, Duke 72
NIT:  Villanova University def. Vanderbilt University
Division II:  California State University-Bakersfield 92, University of Southern Indiana 86
Division III: Lebanon Valley College 66, 59 New York University  OT
NAIA
Division I Oklahoma City University 86, Georgetown College KY 80
Division II Eureka College IL 98, Northern State University SD 95 OT
NJCAA
Division I Hutchinson Community College 78, Three Rivers Community College (MO) 74
Division II Joliet Junior College IL 85,	Owens Technical College OH 80
Division III Gloucester County College 71, Sullivan County CC 69
Women
NCAA
Division I:  North Carolina 60, Louisiana Tech University 59
Division II: North Dakota State 89, Cal State San Bernardino 56
Division III: Capital 82, Washington (Mo.) 63
NAIA
Division I: Southern Nazarene (Okla.) 97, David Lipscomb (Tenn.) 74
Division II Northern State University (S.D.) 48, Western Oregon 45
NJCAA
Division I Trinity Valley CC 104, Westark Community College, Ark. 95
Division II Southwestern Michigan College 81, 	Chattahoochee Valley CC 72
Division III 	Anoka-Ramsey Community College 69, Triton College 62

Awards and honors

Professional
Men
NBA Most Valuable Player Award:   Hakeem Olajuwon, Houston Rockets
NBA Rookie of the Year Award:  Chris Webber Golden State Warriors
NBA Defensive Player of the Year Award:  Hakeem Olajuwon, Houston Rockets
NBA Coach of the Year Award: Lenny Wilkens, Atlanta Hawks

Collegiate
Naismith College Player of the Year
 Men:  Glenn Robinson, Purdue
 Women:  Lisa Leslie, USC
Naismith College Coach of the Year
 Men:  Nolan Richardson Arkansas	
 Women: Pat Summitt Tennessee

Naismith Memorial Basketball Hall of Fame
Class of 1994:
Carol Blazejowski
Denny Crum
Chuck Daly
Buddy Jeannette
Cesare Rubini

Movies
Above the Rim
The Air Up There
Blue Chips
Hoop Dreams

Births
 March 6 — Awa Sissoko, French basketball player

Deaths
 March 13 — Sam Ranzino, All-American at NC State (born 1927)
 May 3 — Vladimir Kostin, FIBA Hall of Fame Russian referee (born 1921)
 June 25 — Katrín Axelsdóttir, Icelandic national team player (born 1956)
 July 10 — Earl Strom, Hall of Fame NBA and ABA referee (born 1927)
 September 3 — Glen Rose, American college player and coach (Arkansas) (born 1905)
 November 11 — Frank McGuire, Hall of Fame coach of the undefeated 1957 National Champion North Carolina Tar Heels (born 1914)
 November 20 — Jānis Krūmiņš, Latvian (Soviet) Olympic Silver medalist (1956, 1960, 1964) (born 1930)

References